Torodora aritai is a moth in the family Lecithoceridae. It was described by Kyu-Tek Park in 2002. It is found in Cambodia and Thailand.

The wingspan is about 18 mm. The forewings are brown with a small yellowish-white patch at four-fifths of the costa and a dark brown elongate spot at the end of the cell.

Etymology
The species is named in honour of Dr. Yutaka Arita, who collected the type specimen.

References

Moths described in 2002
Torodora